Herman Aubrey "Boycie" Boyce (born 31 January 1948) is a fictional character in the BBC sitcom Only Fools and Horses, played by John Challis. His story is continued in the spin-off series The Green Green Grass in which Boycie and his family flee to the countryside to escape from the Driscoll Brothers. A younger Boycie also appears in the prequel series Rock & Chips. Along with Denzil, he is one of only two characters to appear in all three.

Profile
Boycie is a local second-hand car dealer from Lewisham and for a long time was the richest and most successful regular at the Nag's Head pub. Boycie, although materially successful and ostentatious in his spending, remains competitive with Del and other friends, enjoying their company, although he does enjoy revelling in his superiority. Despite this, it appears that he dearly loves his friends throughout the series. He generally wears clothes and carries accessories synonymous with 1980s yuppie success, such as trench coats and very early mobile telephones. In the episode Sickness and Wealth, in which the series regulars took part in a séance, the medium (Uncle Albert's girlfriend, Elsie Partridge) asked for "an Audrey. Audrey. No... Aubrey?" When Boycie replied that his middle name was Aubrey, Trigger said "You never told us your name is Aubrey." Boycie replied "Nor would you if your name was Aubrey." Boycie's drink of choice in the Nag's Head is a large cognac.

Boycie and Del share a loose friendship, but prefer to play a long-standing game of one-upmanship. They play each other at poker, in which they both cheat and the stakes are high. Boycie is at pains to maintain the upper hand over Del in that he is a mason, a successful businessman and wealthier than the Trotters. One of his trademarks is his deep, mocking laugh, usually following a sarcastic, biting remark at the expense of other characters, as well as his distinctive South London nasal twang. Boycie made his first appearance in second episode of the first series; he made sporadic appearances from series 2–5 and appeared more frequently in series 6 and 7.

It is, however, usually Del, a character more street smart and popular with the Nag's Head social group, who gains the upper hand, often trading on the fact that he has a long-standing, flirtatious friendship with Boycie's wife, Marlene. Del has alluded to past sexual encounters with Marlene, and to her reputation among the Nag's Head regulars as "The Peckham Bicycle". He has also claimed to have inside knowledge, through Marlene, of Boycie's marital secrets, and has alleged that Boycie has at times suffered from impotence; these rumours were not fully quashed even after the eventual birth – following many attempts – of Boycie and Marlene's son, Tyler.

Boycie enjoys overt displays of wealth, formerly living in King's Avenue, the most expensive street in south east London. He also owns a holiday cottage in Cornwall.

In The Green Green Grass Boycie is portrayed with the same personality as in Only Fools and Horses but he seems to be more respected by women. In one episode, "Sex and the Country" he is seduced by Tyler's English teacher, who admits she likes more mature men, and in another episode, "Life Swap", Boycie's swapped wife tries to seduce him.

In two episodes, there are allusions to Boycie having had at least two extramarital affairs. In "Go West Young Man", he reveals he has a "bit on the side", for whom he buys an E-type Jaguar, but it is later crashed into while Del is driving it. In "Dates", Del blackmails Boycie into doing a favour for him by threatening to inform Marlene of an encounter Boycie had with a woman in Sheffield.

It is revealed in the episode "From Prussia With Love" that Boycie spent some time in prison in his youth. His criminal record includes convictions for perjury, embezzlement, conspiring to pervert the course of justice, the fraudulent conversion of traveller's cheques and attempting to bribe the Mayor of Lambeth.

In Rock & Chips, Boycie is portrayed as a young man and a member of Del's gang at school. He is still the tight person seen in the original stories, although he is much more amiable and humorous as a young man. Later in the series, after leaving school, he gets a job as a car cleaner for Alberto Balsam, a Spanish second-hand car dealer. Though Boycie is clean shaven throughout the prequel, Sullivan had reportedly intended Boycie to grow his trademark moustache in later episodes.

First name
Throughout Only Fools and Horses and The Green Green Grass, Boycie is given many first names, including Aubrey, which he reveals is his middle name, as can be heard during the séance scene in the episode "Sickness and Wealth". At his remarriage, after discovering his forty-year marriage to Marlene was unofficial because the registrar was unlicensed, the vicar names him as Herman Aubrey Boyce. However, in "Strangers on the Shore", his first name is clearly seen as Terrance on the contract book towards the end of the episode.

References 

Only Fools and Horses characters
Fictional businesspeople
Fictional people from London
Fictional farmers
Television characters introduced in 1981
Freemasonry in fiction
British male characters in television